In automotive design, an RMR, or rear mid-engine, rear-wheel-drive layout is one in which the rear wheels are driven by an engine placed with its center of gravity in front of the rear axle, and thus right behind the passenger compartment. Nowadays more frequently called 'RMR', to acknowledge that certain sporty or performance focused front-engined cars are also "mid-engined", by having the main engine mass behind the front axle, RMR layout cars were previously (until ca. the 1990) just called MR, or mid-engine, rear-wheel-drive layout), because the nuance between distinctly front-engined vs. front mid-engined cars often remained undiscussed.

In contrast to the fully rear-engine, rear-wheel-drive layout, the center of mass of the engine is in front of the rear axle. This layout is typically chosen for its favorable weight distribution. Placing the car's heaviest component within the wheelbase minimizes its rotational inertia around the vertical axis, facilitating turn-in or yaw angle. Also, a near 50/50% weight distribution, with a slight rear weight bias, gives a very favorable balance, with plenty of weight on the driven rear axle under acceleration, while distributing the weight fairly evenly under braking, thereby making optimal use of all four wheels to decelerate the car rapidly as well.

The RMR layout generally has a lower tendency to understeer. However, since there is less weight over the front wheels, under acceleration the front of the car can be prone to lift and still have understeer. Most rear-engine layouts have historically been used in smaller vehicles, because the weight of the engine at the rear has an adverse effect on a larger car's handling, making it 'tail-heavy', although this effect is more pronounced with engines mounted behind the rear axle. It is felt that the low polar inertia is crucial in selection of this layout. The mid-engined layout also uses up central space, making it generally only practical for single seating-row sports-cars, with exception to a handful of 2+2 designs. Additionally, some microtrucks use this layout, with a small, low engine beneath a flat load floor above the rear wheel-wells. This makes it possible to move the cab right to the front of the vehicle, thus increasing the loading area at the expense of slightly reduced load depth.

In modern racing cars, RMR is a common configuration and is usually synonymous with "mid-engine". Due to its weight distribution and the favorable vehicle dynamics it produces, this layout is heavily employed in open-wheel Formula racing cars (such as Formula One and IndyCar) as well as most purpose-built sports racing cars. This configuration was also common in smaller-engined 1950s microcars, in which the engines did not take up much space. Because of successes in motorsport, the RMR platform has been commonly used in many road-going sports cars despite the inherent challenges of design, maintenance and lack of cargo space. The similar mid-engine, four-wheel-drive layout gives many of the same advantages and is used when extra traction is desired, such as in some supercars and in the Group B rally cars.

History
The 1900 NW Rennzweier was one of the first race cars with mid-engine, rear-wheel-drive layout. Other known historical examples include the 1923 Benz Tropfenwagen. It was based on an earlier design named the Rumpler Tropfenwagen in 1921 made by Edmund von Rumpler, an Austrian engineer working at Daimler. The Benz Tropfenwagen was designed by Ferdinand Porsche along with Willy Walb and Hans Nibel. It raced in 1923 and 1924 and was most successful in the Italian Grand Prix in Monza where it stood fourth.  Later, Ferdinand Porsche used mid-engine design concept towards the Auto Union Grand Prix cars of the 1930s which became the first winning RMR racers.  They were decades before their time, although MR Miller Specials raced a few times at Indianapolis between 1939 and 1947. In 1953 Porsche premiered the tiny and altogether new RMR 550 Spyder and in a year it was notoriously winning in the smaller sports and endurance race car classes against much larger cars a sign of greater things to come. The 718 followed similarly in 1958. But it was not until the late 1950s that RMR reappeared in Grand Prix (today's "Formula One") races in the form of the Cooper-Climax (1957), soon followed by cars from BRM and Lotus. Ferrari and Porsche soon made Grand Prix RMR attempts with less initial success. The mid-engined layout was brought back to Indianapolis in 1961 by the Cooper Car Company with Jack Brabham running as high as third and finishing ninth. Cooper did not return, but from 1963 on British built mid-engined cars from constructors like Brabham, Lotus and Lola competed regularly and in 1965 Lotus won Indy with their Type 38.

Rear mid-engines were widely used in microcars like the Isetta or the Zündapp Janus.

The first rear mid-engined road car after WW II was the 1962 (Rene) Bonnet / Matra Djet, which used the 1108cc Renault Sierra engine, mated to the transaxle from the FWD Renault Estafette van. Nearly 1700 were built until 1967. This was followed by the first De Tomaso, the Vallelunga, which mated a tuned Ford Cortina 1500 Kent engine to a VW transaxle with Hewland gearsets. Introduced at Turin in 1963, 58 were built 1964–68. A similar car was the Renault-engined Lotus Europa, built from 1966 to 1975.

Finally, in 1966, the Lamborghini Miura was the first high performance mid-engine, rear-wheel-drive road car.
The concept behind the Miura was that of putting on the road a grand tourer featuring state-of-the-art racing-car technology of the time; hence the Miura was powered by a V12 transversely mounted between the rear wheels, solidal to the gearbox and differential. This represented an extremely innovative sportscar at a time when all of its competitors (aside from the rear-engined Porsches), from Ferraris to Aston Martins, were traditional front-engined, rear-wheel-drive grand tourers.

The Pontiac Fiero was a mid-engined sports car that was built by the Pontiac division of General Motors from 1984 to 1988. The Fiero was the first two-seater Pontiac since the 1926 to 1938 coupes, and also the first mass-produced mid-engine sports car by a U.S. manufacturer.

Gallery

Mid-engine transversely-mounted, rear-wheel-drive layout

Mid-engine longitudinally-mounted, rear-wheel-drive layout

References

External links
 Engine and driveline layout considerations

Car layouts